George Henry Grass Searcy (15 January 1855 – 6 January 1927) was an Australian sportsman, sports official and accountant.

Family
Searcy was born on 15 January 1855 in Geelong, Victoria, Australia, the son of Frederick Searcy and Dinah formerly Simmonds née Grass. His father, and uncle William, had arrived at Port Adelaide on 3 September 1849, on the ship Louisa Baillie.

George married Eleanor Fox, daughter of Henry Fox, on 16 October 1877 at St Mary's English Church, in the inner Melbourne suburb of Hotham. George and Eleanor had three sons.

Community engagement
He was active in the South Australian Liberal Federation, and acted as their accountant for 12 years, and was also being involved in a number of community organisations. He served as auditor to the Kensington and Norwood Corporation for 37 years.

Career
He worked as a cashier and accountant.

He was convicted of fraud on his employer, the Metropolitan Building Society (Melbourne) in 1882 and sentenced to two years imprisonment.

Sporting career
Searcy was a prominent sportsman, on the cricket and Australian rules football playing fields, and later as an official, he was associated with the:
East Melbourne Cricket Club, and was a fine bowler;
in South Australia the North Adelaide Cricket Club and played for several years
He was a cricket umpire and was cricket Test match umpire in international matches for Maclaren's team, between Australia and England in Adelaide on 11 January to 15 January 1895, standing with 'Dimboola' Jim Phillips.  Australia won by a comfortable 382 runs, with Albert Trott taking 8 wickets for 43 runs in an innings and scoring 110 runs without dismissal on debut. 
He played for the Norwood Football Club and was for a time secretary, and was made a life member. He was also a delegate to the South Australian Football League.

See also
Australian Test Cricket Umpires
List of Test umpires

References

External links

 

History of South Australia
Accountants
Australian Test cricket umpires
1855 births
1927 deaths
People from Geelong
Norwood Football Club players
Australian rules footballers from South Australia